Shannon Eric Denton is an American veteran storyteller and artist with credits at Cartoon Network, Warner Bros., Jerry Bruckheimer Films, NBC, Disney, Sony, ToyBiz, Marvel Entertainment, Fox Kids, Paramount Pictures, CBS, Dimension Films, DC Comics, and Nickelodeon.

Biography
SHANNON ERIC DENTON is a veteran storyteller and artist with credits at Cartoon Network, Warner Bros., Riot Games, Showtime, Jerry Bruckheimer Films, NBC, Disney, Sony, LEGO, Marvel Entertainment, FoxKids, Paramount, CBS, Dimension Films, DC Comics, and Nickelodeon.

Shannon Eric Denton was a storyboard artist on the Oscar-nominated feature Jimmy Neutron: Boy Genius and directed the original commercial animations for the movie. He has written for Cartoon Network, Warner Bros. and Disney/Marvel and worked in live action on shows like Community, Con Man, Ally McBeal, Las Vegas, US of Tara and his projects have been featured in Entertainment Weekly and Publishers Weekly.

In 1992, Shannon was an artist for Image Comic's Extreme Studios working with Deadpool creator Rob Liefeld. From 1995-1999 Shannon contributed to the design and development of almost every animated action adventure show produced by the Fox Kids Network, including X-Men, Spider-Man and the Annie nominated Silver Surfer series, as well as doing comic work for DC Comics, Dark Horse, Image Comics and Marvel on titles ranging from Deadpool to Star Wars. He is featured in a section of the book Toon Art: The Graphic Art of Digital Cartooning and contributed to the cover art.

In 2000 he founded Komikwerks, an independent comic publishing entity with partner Patrick Coyle, which has partnered with AOL and comics legend Stan Lee. Komikwerks has also launched a new line of illustrated children's action books under the Actionopolis imprint.

He has worked for publishers Tokyopop, Desperado Publishing, Boom, AiT/Planet Lar, IDW, Dynamite and Image Comics. Shannon was also nominated for the 27th, 28th and 29th Annual ComicBuyersGuide Fan Awards for Favorite Editor. His book GRUNTS: War Stories is also nominated for the 29th Annual ComicBuyersGuide Fan Awards for Favorite Graphic Novel. He worked on the Eisner & Harvey Nominated OUTLAW TERRITORY from Image Comics. His book GRAVESLINGER was nominated for a 2010 Harvey Award. Shannon's co-creation, FLESHDIGGER, was picked as an entrant in Image Comics/TopCow's 2011 Pilot Season project and he was featured on MTV.

Shannon won the 2011 Shel Dorf Award for Editor Of The Year and was again nominated in 2012.

Shannon is currently working with Alan Tudyk, Nathan Fillion and PJ Haarsma on their sci-fi epic SPECTRUM  (spinning out of the Lionsgate/ComicCon HQ Con Man series) and overseeing production of the comic and animation. Shannon was a producer on Season 2 of CON MAN.

Shannon and Actionopolis are represented by Circle Of Confusion

Shannon co-founded TV/film development company Monster Forge Productions with 30 Days of Night co-creator Steve Niles. Monster Forge Productions is repped by APA

Bibliography
Comics work includes:
Supreme #24 (pencils, with writer Gary Carlson, other pencils by Cedric Nocon and inks by Norm Rapmund, Image Comics, 1995)
Deadpool #8-10, 12 (with writer Joe Kelly, other pencils by Ed McGuinness and inks by Norman Lee/Nathan Massengill, Marvel Comics, 1997–1998)
Actionopolis #1 (with various artists, Antarctic Press, 2001)
Common Foe (with co-author Keith Giffen and art by Jean-Jacques Dzialowski, Desperado Publishing, 2005–2006, tpb, 168 pages, December 2007))
 Grunts (with co-author Keith Giffen and art by Matt Jacobs, Arcana Studios, 2006)
 "Aces" (with co-author G. Willow Wilson and art by Curtis Square-Briggs, in Negative Burn #7-10, Desperado Publishing, 2006–2007)
Graveslinger (with co-author Jeff Mariotte and art by John Cboins and Nima Sorat, 4-issue mini-series, Image Comics, October 2007 – 2008)
Gutwrencher (with co-authors Keith Giffen/Steve Niles and art by Anthony Hightower, 3-issue mini-series, Shadowline, 2008)

Writer 
 Airwolf: Airstrikes (2015)  
 Ash and the Army of Darkness (2013)  
 Big Game (1999)  
 Brother Bedlam (2006)  
 Common Foe (2005)  
 Country Ass-Whuppin': A Tornado Relief Anthology (2012) 
 DC Holiday Special '09 (2010) 
 Doc Savage (2013) 
 DoubleFeature: Action (2011) 
 Graveslinger (2007)  
 Grunts (2006)  
 Gutwrencher (2008) 
 Heavy Metal (1977)  
 Knight Rider (2013) 
 Knight Rider: Knight Strikes (2015) 
 Komikwerks (2003)  
 Komikwerks Presents: Nuts and Bolts (2004) 
 Komikwerks Presents: Rockets & Robots (2005) 
 Komikwerks Presents: Thrills & Chills (2005) 
 Lady Rawhide/Lady Zorro (2015) 
 The Lone Ranger (2012) 
 Negative Burn (2005)  
 Ninja High School (1986) 
 Notti & Nyce (2013)  
 Outlaw Territory (2009) 
 Pilot Season: Fleshdigger (2011) 
 The Revenant (2009)  
 Shannon Denton's Actionopolis (2001)  
 The Spider (2012)  
 Tabula Rasa (2006) 
 Tales from a Forgotten Planet (2006) 
 Vampirella (2010) 
 Vampirella Halloween Special 2013 (2013)  
 The X-Files Annual (2014)  
 Zapt! (2006)

Penciller  
 The All New Exiles (1995)  
 Big Bang Comics (1996)  
 Big Game (1999)  
 Deadpool (1997)  
 Fantastic Four: World's Greatest Comics Magazine (2001) 
 Hero Squared (2005)  
 Komikwerks (2003)  
 Komikwerks Presents: Nuts and Bolts (2004) 
 Komikwerks Presents: Thrills & Chills (2005)  
 Marvel Heroes (2010)  
 Marvel Mega (1997)  
 The Mystery of the Roanoke Colony (2007) 
 Outlaw Territory (2009)  
 Prophet (1995)  
 The Sakai Project: Artists Celebrate Thirty Years of Usagi Yojimbo (2014)  
 Scratch9 (2010)  
 Scratch9: Cat Tails (2013)  
 Shannon Denton's Actionopolis (2001)  
 Spawn (1992)  
 Supreme (1992)  
 Violator (1999)  
 Guinness World Record Attempt (2014)

Inker  
 Big Bang Comics (1996)  
 Big Game (1999)  
 Dark Horse Presents (1986)  
 Deadpool (1997)  
 Heavy Metal (1977) 
 Hero Squared (2005)  
 Komikwerks (2003)  
 Komikwerks Presents: Nuts and Bolts (2004)  
 Komikwerks Presents: Thrills & Chills (2005) 
 The Mystery of the Roanoke Colony (2007)  
 Outlaw Territory (2009)  
 Scratch9: Cat Tails (2013)  
 Shannon Denton's Actionopolis (2001) 
 Star Wars: Luke Skywalker - The Last Hope for the Galaxy (2008)

Colorist
 Big Game (1999)  
 Outlaw Territory (2009)  
 Scratch9: Cat Tails (2013)  
 Shannon Denton's Actionopolis (2001)

Letterer  
 Komikwerks (2003)  
 Komikwerks Presents: Thrills & Chills (2005)  
 Stan Lee's Alexa (2005)

Editor  
 Airwolf: Airstrikes (2015)  
 Andre the Giant: Closer to Heaven (2015)  
 The Authority (2008)  
 The Authority: Prime (2007)  
 Chavo Guerrero's Warrior's Creed (2016)  
 Chuck (2008)  
 Free Realms (2009)  
 Garrison (2010)  
 Gears Of War (2008)  
 Gen13 (2006)  
 Ides of Blood (2010)  
 Knight Rider (2013)  
 Knight Rider: Knight Strikes (2015)  
 Miami Vice Remix (2015)  
 Night Trap (2013)  
 Night Trap (2016)  
 Prototype (2009)  
 Rampage Jackson: Street Soldier (2015)  
 Resident Evil (2009)  
 Spectrum (2016)  
 Stormwatch: P.H.D. (2007)  
 Tom Strong and the Robots of Doom (2010)  
 Wetworks: Mutations (2010)  
 WildCats (2008)  
 Wolf Moon (2014) 
 The X-Files (2008)  
 The X-Files/30 Days of Night (2010)

Cover Artist 
 Dark Horse Presents (1986)  
 Komikwerks Presents: Rockets & Robots (2005)  
 Komikwerks Presents: Thrills & Chills (2005)  
 The Mystery of the Roanoke Colony (2007) 
 Shannon Denton's Actionopolis (2001)
 Deadpool

Screenwriting
 Hi Hi Puffy AmiYumi (2006)
 World of Quest (2008-2009)
 Justice League Action (2017)
 Ben 10 (2017)
 Transformers: Robots in Disguise (2017)
 Avengers Assemble (2017)
 Spider-Man (2019)

Animation
 X-Men: The Animated Series
 Detention
 Teenage Mutant Ninja Turtles
 Jimmy Neutron
 Danny Phantom
 Teen Titans
 Silver Surfer
 Justice League
 Avengers
 Spider-Man
 Ally McBeal
 Las Vegas
 Con Man
 American Dad!
 United States of Tara
 Dan Dare
 He-Man
 G.I. Joe
 Community
 Stillwater
 Samurai Rabbit
 The Simpsons
 Crossing Swords
 Army of the Dead
 Batman
 Scooby Doo
 Corn & Peg
 The Life and Times of Juniper Lee

Video games
 Final Fantasy VII
 League Of Legends
 Wild Rift
 Legends of Runeterra
 Valorant
 God Of War
 Kingdoms of Amalur
 Neo-Pets
 Overwatch
 Diablo
 Hearthstone
 Warcraft
 StarCraft

Toys
Toy company work includes:
 Hasbro
 Lego
 Marvel

Notes

References

External links
 
 Denton's concept portfolio website
 Komikwerks.com

http://www.actionopolis.com/
http://www.agentofdanger.com/
 https://www.monsterforgeproductions.com/

American comics artists
Comic book editors
Living people
Year of birth missing (living people)
Place of birth missing (living people)
American storyboard artists